WMTS may refer to:

 WMTS-FM, a radio station (88.3 FM) licensed to Murfreesboro, Tennessee, United States
 Wireless Medical Telemetry Service, certain frequencies set aside by the FCC for wireless medical telemetry
Web Map Tile Service, an Open Geospatial Consortium (OGC) standard for providing map tiles (small images that are part of a map) via the internet